The North Line of the Chennai Suburban Railway is the third-longest suburban rail line in the system, running north from Chennai Central MMC to Bitragunta in Andhra Pradesh. Suburban services terminate at Sullurpeta and MEMU services operate to Bitragunta. As of 2013, more than 100,000 people use trains on the 46-km line between Chennai Central and Gummidipoondi every day, up from less than 80,000 in 2010. By 2017, this has increased to 120,000 people per day.

Sections

Chennai Central MMC - Gummidipoondi
 Suburban trains; runs on two dedicated 3rd and 4th lines between Chennai Central - Athipattu (0 - 22 km) .
 Suburban trains; runs on two main lines from Athipattu to Gummidipoondi (22 km - 46 km).

Problems in the north line

Commuters on the Chennai Central-Gummidipoondi suburban line are concerned about irregular train services, poor maintenance and lack of amenities such as drinking water, public convenience and security in the stations.
Commuters feel as step-motherly treatment compared to the services and amenities provided on the Chennai Central-Thiruvallur-Arakkonam and the Chennai Beach-Tambaram-Chengalpattu sections.

It is common for trains to wait for clearance at signals between Ennore-Chennai Central. All the trains are always late by 20 to 30 min.

Gummidipoondi - Sulurpeta (AP)

 Suburban trains; runs on two main lines.

Sulurpeta(AP) - Bitragunta (AP)

 MEMU trains run between Chennai Central MMC and Nellore to be extended to Bitragunta.
 Passenger trains run between Chennai Central MMC and Bitragunta via Nellore.

Expansion
The third and fourth lines in the route is being laid at a cost of  2,750 million. The memorandum of understanding (MoU) for exchange of land between the Southern Railways and Chennai Port Trust was signed in 2015 to commission the third and fourth lines. The fourth line between Chennai Beach and Athipattu costs  1200 million running to a length of 22.1 km. The third line between Athipattu and Korukkupet was commissioned at a cost of  1,550 million, running for a length of 18 km and the fourth line in the section between Tiruvottiyur and Ennore for a length of 7 km was commissioned on 24 June 2017. The third line between Chennai Beach and Korukkupet will run for a length of 4.1 km at a cost of  1,420 million and is expected to be completed by March 2018.

References 

Chennai Suburban Railway